Sir William Godolphin MP (ca. 1486 – ca. 1570) was a 16th-century English knight, politician, and Member of Parliament.

Life 

He was the son of Sir John Godolphin, who was High Sheriff of Cornwall in 1505, and his wife Margaret, daughter of John Trenouth.

He sat as Member for Cornwall during the reign of Henry VIII and possibly also of Edward VI, and also served as High Sheriff of Cornwall and Warden of the Stannaries.

Godolphin wrote to Thomas Cromwell sending him a present of Cornish tin which could be made into pewter vessels. The ingots were marked with a bow and broad arrow and a horseshoe. He offered to send Cornish wrestlers to accompany Henry VIII if the king visited Calais. He sent two wrestlers to Cromwell whose command of the English language was not good, presumably they were Cornish speakers.

He seems to have been confused with his eldest son, also Sir William (1515–1570), not least in Burke's Extinct Peerage which conflates the two, so that is not clear which offices were held by the elder and which by the younger. Sir William lived to an advanced age, dying at around the same time as his son, which may have been the original cause of the confusion.

Family 
He married Margaret Glynn, and they had four children:
 Sir William Godolphin (1515–1570), who had three daughters but no sons
 Thomas Godolphin (born 1520), married Katherine Bonithon, Captain (governor) of the Isles of Scilly, through whom the male line of the family was continued. Their great-grandson would be George Lamberton, Captain of the "Fellowship", disappeared at sea in 1646 and subject of Longfellow's poem "The Phantom Ship".
 Elizabeth Godolphin (born 1522), married John Langdon
 Honor Godolphin (born ca. 1524), married William Melton

Ancestry

References

Further reading

 Burke's Extinct Peerage (London: Henry Colburn & Richard Bentley, 1831) 
 Collins' Peerage of England (London, 1768) 
 'The Scilly Islands', Magna Britannia: volume 3: Cornwall (1814), pp. 330–337. 

1480s births
1570s deaths
Year of birth uncertain
15th-century English people
16th-century English MPs
William
High Sheriffs of Cornwall
Members of the pre-1707 English Parliament for constituencies in Cornwall
Knights Bachelor